Charles John Smith (1803–1838) was an English engraver.

Life
He was born in 1803 at Chelsea where his father, James Smith, practised as a surgeon. He was a pupil of Charles Pye, and became an engraver of book illustrations of a topographical and antiquarian character.  He was elected a Fellow of the Society of Antiquaries in 1837, and died of paralysis in Albany Street, London, on 23 November 1838.

Works

He executed a few of the later plates in Charles Stothard's Monumental Effigies, the views of houses and monuments in Edmund Cartwright's Rape of Bramber, 1830, and plates from illuminated manuscripts for Thomas Frognall Dibdin's Tour in the Northern Counties of England, 1838. In 1829 Smith published a series of Autographs of Royal, Noble, and Illustrious Persons, with memoirs by John Gough Nichols, and later started another serial work, Historical and Literary Curiosities, which he did not live to complete.

References

External links
Historical and Literary Curiosities, at archive.org

Attribution

1803 births
1838 deaths
English engravers
Fellows of the Society of Antiquaries of London